The 2008 Bayern Rundfahrt was the 29th edition of the Bayern Rundfahrt cycle race and was held on 28 May to 1 June 2008. The race started in Freyung and finished in Erlangen. The race was won by Christian Knees.

General classification

References

Bayern-Rundfahrt
2008 in German sport